Artocarpus scortechinii is a plant species in the family Moraceae.

scortechinii